Johannes Jacobus van Rhijn served as the twelfth Archbishop of Utrecht from 1797 to 1808.

Early Ministry

Before serving as Archbishop of Utrecht, van Rhijn served as a parish priest in Utrecht.

Archbishop of Utrecht

Following the death of Walter van Nieuwenhuisen, Archbishop of Utrecht, on Good Friday, 14 April 1797, van Rhijn was consecrated Archbishop of Utrecht by Bishop Adrianus Johannes Broekman of Haarlem and Bishop Nicolas Nellemans of Deventer. He was subsequently excommunicated for the act by the Roman Catholic Church.

Death

C.B. Moss suggests that, perhaps linked to the fact that “Napoleon, who was now the real ruler of the Netherlands, [and] was determined to put an end to the independence of the Church of Utrecht,” van Rhijn died suddenly on 24 June 1808. Neale suggests that van Rhijn was poisoned.

References 

18th-century archbishops
19th-century archbishops
18th-century births
Year of birth missing
1808 deaths
Dutch Old Catholic bishops
People excommunicated by the Catholic Church